Chit is a Burmese name used by both genders. Notable bearers of the name include:
Chit Chit (born 1996), Burmese football defender
Chit Hlaing (1879–1952), Burmese politician
Chit Ko Ko (1917–2008), Burmese botanist 
Chit Maung (1913–1945), Burmese journalist and writer 
Chit San Maung (guitarist), Burmese musician and guitarist
Chit San Maung (footballer) (born 1988), Burmese football defender 
Chit Swe (born 1932), Burmese Minister for Agriculture and Forestry
Thakin Chit Maung (1915–2005), Burmese politician 
Walter Chit Tun (1898–1947), Burmese bodybuilder and weightlifter

Burmese names